Dalen Portland is a 1977 novel by Norwegian author Kjartan Fløgstad. It won the Nordic Council's Literature Prize in 1978.

References

1977 novels
20th-century Norwegian novels
Norwegian-language novels
Nordic Council's Literature Prize-winning works